Chahar Takht-e Kuk (also Romanized as Chahār Takht-e Kūk and Chahār Takht-e Gūk; also known as Chahār Takhteh Gūk) is a village in Mian Rokh Rural District, Jolgeh Rokh District, Torbat-e Heydarieh County, Razavi Khorasan Province, Iran. At the 2006 census, its population was 268, in 62 families.

References 

Populated places in Torbat-e Heydarieh County